is a Japanese yonkoma manga series written and illustrated by Katsuwo. It was serialized in ASCII Media Works' Comic Dengeki Daioh "g" magazine from September 2013 to April 2021. Eight tankōbon volumes have been released. An anime television series adaptation by C2C aired from April to June 2019.

Story
Bocchi Hitori, a girl with social anxiety who has difficulty communicating with others. Before starting middle school, her friend Kai Yawara, who will be attending a different school, tells Bocchi she is breaking off their friendship until she can make friends with her entire class at her new school. Thus, Bocchi is left with the task of befriending everyone in her class before graduation.

Characters

A girl whose social anxiety makes it hard to talk to people. When her only friend Kai breaks up with her, she is tasked with trying to befriend everyone in class, usually passing out whenever she does.

The first friend Bocchi makes upon entering middle school. She has a tough appearance, but is actually kind and supportive of Bocchi.

The vice representative in Bocchi's class. She often puts on an appearance to hide the fact that she is actually somewhat of a loser.

Bocchi's classmate who comes from another country and considers herself to be a ninja.

The public morals officer in Bocchi's school. She has a policy against making friends as she wants to become strong enough to live by herself.

Bocchi's friend from elementary school. Concerned over Bocchi's social anxiety after ending up in a different middle school, she breaks off her friendship with Bocchi in order to encourage her to make new friends.
 

 Bocchi's classmate who is a student librarian. She is shy like Bocchi.
 

 Bocchi's classmate who loves sweets.
 

 Bocchi's classmate who is a member of the school's tennis club.
 
 The homeroom leader of Bocchi's class.
 

 Bocchi's classmate who comes from a rich family.
 

 Bocchi's classmate who is the older twin. Notsugi calls her Saki.
 

 Bocchi's classmate who is the younger twin. Nosaki says her voice is too loud. Nosaki calls her Tsugu (not Tsugi).
 

 Bocchi's classmate who is the most popular person in the class. Her classmates call her Mīna. She sings bad songs in a loud voice.
 She used to go to the same elementary school as Kō Futō and Kō was her only friend then. Since Kō refused to go to school, she has behaved to make her classes fun so that Kō doesn't feel nervous.
 
 Bocchi's classmate who refuses to go to school.

The homeroom teacher of Bocchi's class who is called "Teru-chan" by her students. She has an irrational fear of Nako.
 
 

Media

Manga
Hitori Bocchi no Marumaru Seikatsu, written and illustrated by Katsuwo, was serialized in ASCII Media Works' Comic Dengeki Daioh "g" magazine from September 27, 2013 to April 27, 2021. Eight tankōbon volumes were published from November 27, 2014 to June 25, 2021.

Anime
An anime television series adaptation was announced after the final episode of Mitsuboshi Colors, the anime adaptation of another manga series by the same author, on March 25, 2018. The series was directed by Takebumi Anzai and written by Jukki Hanada, with animation by studio C2C. Kii Tanaka was the character designer and the chief animation director. Ryuichi Takada and Hidekazu Tanaka composed the series' music.

Reception
Gadget Tsūshin listed a line from the sixth episode's ending theme in their 2019 anime buzzwords list.

See also
 Bocchi the Rock!, a similarly named series with a similar premise
 Komi Can't Communicate
 Mitsuboshi Colors
 No Matter How I Look at It, It's You Guys' Fault I'm Not Popular!

Notes

References

External links
 
 

2019 anime television series debuts
Anime series based on manga
Animeism
ASCII Media Works manga
C2C (studio)
Comedy anime and manga
Crunchyroll anime
Dengeki Comics
Kadokawa Dwango franchises
Muse Communication
School life in anime and manga
Shōnen manga
Slice of life anime and manga
Yonkoma